Founded in 2000 by Mathieu Kassovitz, MNP is a French film production company headed by Mathieu Kassovitz and Guillaume Colboc.
Kassovitz established the company in 2000 "to develop and produce feature films by Kassovitz and to represent him as a director and actor.". MNP is named after  Mir Space Station, whose writing in Cyrillic letters (Мир) look like the letters MNP.

The company closed in 2010.

MNP Entreprise was responsible for the productions of a number of films including:
Avida (2006) in which Kassovits acts
Babylon A.D. which Kassovitz directed. 
Johnny Mad Dog co-produced by MNP and directed by Jean-Stéphane Sauvaire. It is based on a novel by the same name by the Congolese writer Emmanuel Dongala. The premiere of the film was made at the 2008 Cannes Film Festival where it was screened within the Un Certain Regard section.

References

Film production companies of France
Companies established in 2000